Democracy Docket is a Democratic Party voting advocacy group. The group was founded in 2020 by lawyer Marc Elias with funding from the Hopewell Fund and Priorities USA Action.

Elias launched Democracy Docket on March 5, 2020, with the stated goal of educating the public on voting rights and redistricting litigation. Elias was concerned that the Republican Party would have a newfound freedom in its efforts, as a court order prohibiting the party from past voter suppression tactics had expired. Writing that, in one Republican leader's words, the GOP planned to sue Democrats "into oblivion and spend whatever is necessary," Elias envisioned Democracy Docket as a platform to raise awareness and support efforts to defend election rules and results from Republican lawsuits in what was anticipated to be a close presidential election.

Democracy Docket has focused on making absentee voting more accessible, arguing that postage for mail-in ballots must be free or prepaid by the government, that ballots postmarked on or before election day must count, that signature matching laws should be reformed, and that community organizations should be permitted to help collect and deliver voted, sealed ballots.

League of Women Voters of Oklahoma shared a Democracy Docket post explaining how redistricting can disenfranchise voters, a condition referred to as “vote dilution”.

Democracy Docket has written on legal efforts to restrict voting rights. This includes removal of ballot drop box lawsuits initiated by former Trump administration staff and advisors. Ballot drop boxes were popularized due to the 2019 global coronavirus pandemic and the associated  minimizing of in-person polling place voting. Democracy Docket has also reported about the numerous redistricting congressional district lawsuits filed in several states prior to the 2024 elections.

References

External links 
 
Election and voting-related organizations based in the United States
Political advocacy groups in the United States